St. David's Chapel is a Church of Scotland church in Stormontfield, Perth and Kinross, Scotland. Now a Category B listed building, it was built in 1897, to a design by architect Alexander Marshall Mackenzie.

Mackenzie was given the brief that the church should "be able to accommodate 100 people, be of early English design and be built at an estimated cost of £550". A bellcote is shown in the original plans but was not included in the construction.

According to the Perthshire Advertiser, the church was dedicated on 30 July 1897.

Where yew trees now arch above the entrance path to the main door there once was a wooden footbridge spanning over Colen Burn.

The chapel's sundial, to the right of the chapel entrance, was gifted to the church by R. W. R. Mackenzie. It is cast from lead and decorated with thistles and gilding. The sundial was stolen in January 1985, but it was found on British Rail ground in the Craigie area of Perth.

Construction personnel
The individuals responsible for the chapel's construction:

Messrs Bruce and Miller (masons)
Messrs Stewart and McFarlane (carpenters)
Mr Chalmers (slater)
Mr J. Whyte (painter)
Mr Pennycook of Stormontfield (superintendent)

See also

List of listed buildings in Scone, Perth and Kinross

References

External links
Stormontfield, St David's Chapel And War Memorial – Canmore.org.uk
St David's Chapel – Places of Worship in Scotland
St Davids Chapel Stormontfield Perthshire Scotland tourscotland, YouTube, 19 June 2012 (exterior shots)
Stormontfield Church Interior Scotland tourscotland, YouTube, 21 April 2011 (interior shots)
Aerial views of the church – Atomaerial.com

Churches in Perth and Kinross
1897 establishments in Scotland
Churches completed in 1876
19th-century Church of Scotland church buildings
Church of Scotland churches in Scotland
Category B listed buildings in Perth and Kinross
Listed churches in Scotland